This is a family tree of the main line of descent of Confucius.

Family tree

List of prominent descendants of Confucius not in the main line

The title of Duke of Song and "Duke Who Continues and Honours the Yin" (殷紹嘉公) were bestowed upon Kong An (孔安 (東漢) by the Eastern Han dynasty because he was part of the Shang dynasty's legacy. This branch of the Confucius family is a separate branch from the line that held the title of Marquis of Fengsheng village and later Duke Yansheng.

 Kong Anguo 11th generation descendant, son of Kong Zhong
 Kong Jie 孔捷, Kong Xi 孔喜, Kong Guang 孔光, sons of Kong Ba 孔霸, younger brothers of Kong Fu 孔福. 14th generation descendants.
 Kong Zhou (Eastern Han) 20th generation descendant 
 Kong Rong 20th generation descendant
The Southern Branch of the Confucius family at Quzhou. During the Southern Song dynasty the descendant of Confucius at Qufu, the Duke Yansheng Kong Duanyou fled south with the Song Emperor to Quzhou, while the newly established Jin dynasty (1115–1234) in the north appointed Kong Duanyou's brother Kong Duancao who remained in Qufu as Duke Yansheng. From that time up until the Yuan dynasty, there were two Duke Yanshengs, one in the north in Qufu and the other in the south at Quzhou. An invitation to come back to Qufu was extended to the southern Duke Yansheng Kong Zhu by the Yuan dynasty Emperor Kublai Khan. The title was taken away from the southern branch after Kong Zhu rejected the invitation, so the northern branch of the family kept the title of Duke Yansheng. The southern branch still remained in Quzhou where they lived to this day. Confucius's descendants in Quzhou alone number 30,000. The Hanlin Academy rank of Wujing boshi 五經博士 was awarded to the southern branch at Quzhou by a Ming Emperor while the northern branch at Qufu held the title Duke Yansheng.
 Kong Ruogu 孔若古 Kong Chuan 47th generation Claimed to be the ancestor of the Southern branch after Kong Zhu died by Northern branch member Kong Guanghuang. The leader of the southern branch is 孔祥楷 Kong Xiangkai.
 Kong Daofu 孔道輔 45th generation, Grand Master of Remonstrance of the Right under Emperor Renzong of Song
Kong Zonghan 孔宗翰 46th generation, Song dynasty official
 Kong Zongyuan 孔宗願 46th generation
 Kong Ruozhuo 孔若拙 47th generation
 Kong Yu 孔瑀, 49th generation 
 Kong Zongshou 孔宗壽 46th generation
 Kong Jian 孔僉
 Kong Shuxuan 孔淑玄
 Kong Yingda 32nd generation descendant, son of Kong An (孔安) 31st generation, son of Kong Shuo (孔碩) 30st generation, son of Kong Linggui (孔靈龜 29th generation, descendant of Kong Yang 孔扬 22nd generation, son of Kong Yu 孔郁 21st generation, 7th generation descendant of Kong Fu 孔福) (The Kong An here was a 31st generation descendant who lived during the Northern Qi and was not the same as the Kong An (孔安) shown on the tree who was a 17th generation descendant who lived during the Eastern Han dynasty)
 Kong Xiuyuan 孔休源 32nd generation
 Kong Zongfan 孔宗笵 33rd generation
 Kong Yuntong 孔雲童 33rd generation
 Kong Keren 孔克仁 55th generation descendant.
 Kong Gongxun 孔公恂 58th generation
 Kong Wenji 孔聞籍 62nd generation
 Kong Zhenkan 孔貞堪, 63rd generation, Magistrate of Qufu, surrendered to Li Zicheng.
Kong Shangze 孔尚則 64th generation.
 Kong Shangren 64th generation descendant
Kong Xianglin (K'ung Hsiang-lin)孔祥霖 75th generation descendant
H. H. Kung (Kong Xiangxi) 75th generation descendant, son of Kong Fanci
His children were Kong Lingyi (Kung Ling-i) 孔令儀, Kong Lingkan (Kung Ling-k'an) 孔令侃, Kong Lingjun (Kung Ling-chun) 孔令俊, and Kong Lingjie (Kung Ling-chie) 孔令傑. One of H. H. Kung's sons, Kong Lingjie 孔令傑 married Debra Paget who gave birth to Gregory Kung.
Kong Xianglin 孔祥林, philosopher, Deputy Dean of the Research Institute of Confucianism, Director of the Qufu Committee for the Preservation of Cultural Relics.
Kong Fanqi 74th generation descendant, mother of Li Fengshan (李鳳山) and grandmother of Ann Li (李怜宜)
Kong Zhaoshou 71st generation descendant
Kong Zhaowei 孔昭巍  71st generation descendant
Kong Deyong, 77th generation descendant
Kong Xiangxian, Chinese Muslim, 75th generation descendant
Kong Dejun Chinese Muslim Islamic scholar, 77th generation descendant
Kong Lingjun 孔令儁, 76th generation descendant
曲阜孔氏 (곡부 공씨 in Korean; Gokbu Gong clan in English): During the Yuan dynasty, Gong So (孔紹/공소, 1304-1381), who claimed to be one of the Duke Yansheng Kong Huan's 孔浣 sons, moved from China to Goryeo era Korea, wedding a Korean woman (Jo Jin-gyeong's [曹晉慶] daughter) during Toghon Temür's rule. Gong So's descendants have established numerous cadet branches to the modern era.

Generation name
Along with the descendants of the other Four Sages (Confucius, Mencius, Zengzi, and Yan Hui), the descendants of Confucius still determine part of their children's given names using this generation poem given to them by the Ming dynasty Jianwen Emperor and extended by later emperors:

希言公彥承，宏聞貞尚衍；
興毓傳繼廣，昭憲慶繁祥；
令德維垂佑，欽紹念顯揚；
建道敦安定，懋修肇彝常；
裕文煥景瑞，永錫世緒昌。

See also
 Duke Yansheng (the title of these descendants since the Song dynasty)
 Confucius Genealogy Compilation Committee
 孔子世家 Well known individual descendants of Confucius listed by generation
 孔子世家大宗世系 Family tree tracing descent from the Yellow Emperor down to the Dukes of Yansheng
 孔子世家南宗北宗世系图 Family tree showing the split between the Northern and Southern branches of Confucius descendants.
 孔子世家总世系图 (中兴祖前)
 孔子世家谱 History of the Confucius Family Tree compilation
 孔子世家四支和五位的世系圖 Cadet branches which break off at Kong Renyu 孔仁玉.
 孔子世家五凝世系图 Cadet branches from the five sons of Kong Zhaohuan 孔昭煥
 孔子世家十二府世系图 The 12 cadet branches descended from Kong Xingxie 孔兴燮
 Gokbu Gong clan Branch of Confucius descendants in Korea established by Kong Shao who moved from China to Korea and married a Korean woman.

Bibliography
Records of the Grand Historian: Annals of the Shang Dynasty 《史记·殷本纪》
Wang Guowei, Guantang Jilin 王国维《观堂集林》
Records of the Grand Historian: House of Song Weizi《史记·宋微子世家》
Records of the Grand Historian: House of Kongzi《史记·孔子世家》
Chunqiu Zuozhuan zhengyi 《春秋左传正义·昭公七年》
Book of Han: Annals of Emperor Cheng 《汉书·成帝纪》
Book of Han: Table of nobles from families of the imperial consorts《汉书·外戚恩泽表》
Book of Han: Biographies of Kuang, Zhang, Kong and Ma《汉书·匡张孔马传》
Book of the Later Han: Biographies of Confucians 《后汉书·儒林传上·孔僖传》 
Annotation of Book of the Later Han: Biographies of Confucians 《后汉书注·儒林传上·孔僖传》 
New Book of Tang: Table of genealogy of Chancellors V 《新唐书·宰相世系表五》
History of Song: Biographies of Confucians I 《宋史·儒林一·孔宜传》 
History of Song: Rites 22《宋史•志第七十二》
History of Jin: Biography of Kong Fan 《金史·孔璠传》
History of Yuan: Biography of Kong Sihui 《元史·孔思晦传》 
History of Ming: Biographies of Confucians III 《明史·儒林三·孔希学传》 
Draft History of Qing: Biographies of Confucians IV《清史稿·儒林四》
Liancongzi《连从子·叙书》
Genealogy book of House of Kongzi《孔子世家谱》 山东友谊出版社 
Family Sayings of Confucius 《孔子家語》

References

Further reading
 

Family trees
Descent from antiquity
People from Qufu
Family tree